Vivekananda Degree College, Kukatpally is an education institution in Kukatpally, Hyderabad, Telangana, India named after Swami Vivekananda.

Origin 
The college was established in 2005.

The college is named after an ascetic, Swami Vivekananda.

Campus 

The school  is located in a serene atmosphere beside the lake at kukatpally and backside building of Pragathi women's degree college.

Courses 

 B.Sc. (physical sciences)
 Mathematics, physics and chemistry
 Mathematics, chemistry and computer science
 Mathematics, physics and computer science
 Mathematics, statistics and computer science
 B.Sc. (life sciences)
 Bio-technology, microbiology, chemistry
 Bio-technology, bio-chemistry, chemistry
 Commerce
 B. Com: general
 B. Com: computers
 B. Com: computer applications

Laboratories 
 Computer labs
 Physics lab
 BOM lab
 Chemistry Lab
 Bio-Tech Lab
 Life sciences Labs
 Micro-Biology Lab
 Commerce Lab
 English lab

See also 
 Vivekananda Degree College, Puttur
Education in India
Literacy in India
List of institutions of higher education in Telangana

References

External links

Educational institutions established in 2005
Universities and colleges in Hyderabad, India
2005 establishments in Andhra Pradesh